Guiyang is the capital of Guizhou Province, China.

Guiyang may also refer to:
Roman Catholic Archdiocese of Guiyang, in Guiyang, Guizhou, China
Guiyang County, in Chenzhou, Hunan, China
Guiyang Commandery
Guiyang school, one of the five major schools of Ch'an Buddhism